is a publishing label affiliated with the Japanese publishing company Media Factory. It was established in July 2002 and is a light novel label that is aimed at young adult males with a focus on visual novel-style plots and harem romantic comedies.

Light novels published under MF Bunko J

0-9

A

B

C

D

E

F

G

H

I

J

K

L

M

N

O

P

R

S

T

U

V

W

X

Y

Z

References

External links
 

2002 establishments in Japan
Book publishing company imprints